Jessie Milliken (1877–1951) was a botanist noted for identifying several species in the Polemoniaceae family.  She was married to the experimental psychologist Warner Brown.

Works

References

1877 births
1951 deaths
Women botanists